Conrail's Passaic and Harsimus Line serves freight in northeastern New Jersey, as an alternate to the mainly passenger Northeast Corridor. It takes trains from the Northeast Corridor and Lehigh Line near Newark Liberty International Airport northeast and east into Jersey City, New Jersey, serving as part of CSX's main corridor from upstate New York to the rest of the east coast.

Route description 

The line begins at a junction with Amtrak's Northeast Corridor at Lane Interlocking . near Waverly Yard . It runs next to the Northeast Corridor, just to the east, along what was originally Track 0 (the old P&H Branch east of the yard is now abandoned).

After about a mile, the Greenville Secondary splits to the east to the Lehigh Valley Railroad Bridge, and the P&H Line passes under the Lehigh Line and turns east. Access to the Lehigh Line eastbound is provided from the Greenville Branch via a track into the Oak Island Yard ; another track leaves the Oak Island Yard to join the P&H Line headed northbound.

After crossing the Passaic River on the Point-No-Point Bridge , the P&H Line passes over PATH and turns east, parallel to PATH. A track splitting just before the overpass accesses the area south of PATH. The P&H Line then heads east through West Hudson and then across the Harsimus Branch Lift Bridge over the Hackensack River to Marion Junction , where the Northern Running Track goes north, with most rail traffic.

The P&H Line past Marion Junction is now a secondary connection through the Journal Square Transportation Center  to the National Docks Branch via a short section of the former River Line. The former River Line in Hoboken and Weehawken is now used for the Hudson-Bergen Light Rail.

History
The P&H Line, before passing to Conrail, was the Pennsylvania Railroad's P&H Line. Before that, it was the Waverly and Passaic Branch south of the bridge over PATH, the PRR's main line from there to the River Line, and the Harsimus Branch where track no longer exists, east along the Harsimus Stem Embankment to Harsimus Cove.

See also
Timeline of Jersey City area railroads
National Docks Secondary
List of Hudson County railroad terminals
List of bridges, tunnels, and cuts in Hudson County, New Jersey
List of bridges documented by the Historic American Engineering Record in New Jersey

References

External links 
 Historic American Engineering Record (HAER) No. NJ-43, "Conrail Bridge" (documentation of Hackensack River lift bridge)

Conrail lines
Pennsylvania Railroad lines
Rail transportation in New Jersey
Transportation in Essex County, New Jersey
Transportation in Hudson County, New Jersey
Pennsylvania Railroad Through-freight Lines